John Lucy (fl. 1372) was an English Member of Parliament.

He was a Member (MP) of the Parliament of England for Gloucestershire in 1372.

References

Year of birth missing
Year of death missing
English MPs 1372
Members of the Parliament of England for Gloucestershire